The 2009 ACC football season was an NCAA football season that was played from September 3, 2009, to January 5, 2010. The Atlantic Coast Conference consists of 12 members in two divisions. The Atlantic division consists of Boston College, Clemson, Florida State, Maryland, North Carolina State and Wake Forest. The Coastal division consists of Duke, Georgia Tech, Miami, North Carolina, Virginia, and Virginia Tech. The division champions met in the 2009 ACC Championship Game, where Georgia Tech defeated Clemson by a score of 39–34. Georgia Tech represented the ACC in the BCS, being invited to the FedEx Orange Bowl where they lost to Iowa. The ACC had a total of seven teams play in a bowl game and finished the bowl season with a record of 3–4.

Previous season 
Boston College and Florida State tied for the Atlantic division championship. Boston College beat Florida State during the regular season so they represented the Atlantic division in the 2008 ACC Championship Game. A similar situation occurred in the Coastal division where Virginia Tech and Georgia Tech tied. Virginia Tech won the regular season meeting so they represented the Coastal division in the championship game. Virginia Tech would win the ACC championship game 30-12 over Boston College and would represent the ACC in the FedEx Orange Bowl where they would defeat Cincinnati, the champions of the Big East Conference, 20-7.
 
The ACC would ultimately send 10 teams to bowl games, the most of any conference in 2008. Boston College (9-5) lost to Vanderbilt 16-14 in the Music City Bowl. Florida State (9-4) beat Wisconsin 42-13 in the Champs Sports Bowl. Georgia Tech (9-4) lost to LSU 38-3 in the Chick-fil-A Bowl. Maryland (8-5) beat Nevada 42-35 in the Roady's Humanitarian Bowl. North Carolina (8-5) lost to West Virginia 31-30 in the Meineke Car Care Bowl. Wake Forest (8-5) beat Navy 29-19 in the EagleBank Bowl. Miami (7-6) lost to California 24-17 in the Emerald Bowl. Clemson (7-6) lost to Nebraska 26-21 in the Konica Minolta Gator Bowl. North Carolina State (6-7) lost to Rutgers 29-23 in the PapaJohns.com Bowl. The only two teams not to go to a bowl game were Virginia (5-7) and Duke (4-8).

Preseason

Preseason poll 
The 2009 ACC preseason poll was announced at the ACC Football Kickoff meetings in Greensboro, North Carolina on July 27. Virginia Tech was voted to win Coastal division and the conference. Florida State was voted to win the Atlantic division. Jonathan Dwyer of Georgia Tech was voted the Preseason ACC Player of the Year.

Atlantic Division poll
 Florida State – 499 (56)
 Clemson – 387 (14)
 North Carolina State – 364 (10)
 Wake Forest – 295 (7)
 Maryland – 157
 Boston College – 145

Coastal Division poll
 Virginia Tech – 512 (78)
 Georgia Tech – 415 (9)
 North Carolina – 350
 Miami – 21
 Virginia – 148
 Duke – 120

Predicted ACC Championship Game Winner
 Virginia Tech–69
 Florida State–7
 Georgia Tech–7
 Clemson–2
 North Carolina State–2

Preseason All Conference Teams

Offense
QB Russell Wilson- NC State,       
RB Jonathan Dwyer- Georgia Tech,       
RB C. J. Spiller- Clemson,       
WR Demaryius Thomas- Georgia Tech,       
WR Jacoby Ford- Clemson,       
TE Greg Boone- Virginia Tech,       
OT Jason Curtis Fox- Miami,       
OT Anthony Castonzo- Boston College,       
OG Sergio Render- Virginia Tech,       
OG Rodney Hudson- Florida State,       
C  Matt Tennant- Boston College,       
PK Matt Bosher- Miami.

Defense

DE Jason Worilds- Virginia Tech,       
DE Willie Young- NC State,       
DT Vince Oghobaase- Duke,       
DT Marvin Austin- North Carolina,      
LB Dekoda Watson- Florida State,        
LB Quan Sturdivant- North Carolina,       
LB Alex Wujciak- Maryland,        
CB Ras-I Dowling- Virginia,        
CB Kendric Burney- North Carolina,       
S Morgan Burnett- Georgia Tech,       
S Kam Chancellor- Virginia Tech,       
P Travis Baltz- Maryland,        
Specialist: C. J. Spiller- Clemson.

Award watch lists

Regular season 

All times Eastern time

Rankings reflect that of the USA Today Coaches poll until week eight when the BCS poll will be used.

Week One 
ESPN's College GameDay broadcast from Atlanta for the Chick-fil-A Kickoff Game against Virginia Tech and Alabama.

Players of the week:

Week Two 

Players of the week:

Week Three 

Players of the week:

Week Four 

Players of the week:

Week Five 
ESPN's College Gameday broadcast from Chestnut Hill, Massachusetts for the Boston College vs Florida State game. Boston College linebacker Mark Herzlich, the 2008 ACC Defensive player of the year who earlier in the year was diagnosed with Ewing's sarcoma, announced he was now cancer free.

Players of the week:

Week Six 

Players of the week:

Week Seven 

Players of the week:

Week Eight 

Players of the week:

Week Nine 

Players of the week:

Week Ten 

Players of the week:

Week Eleven 

Players of the week:

Week Twelve 

Players of the week:

Week Thirteen 
ESPN's College Gameday broadcast from Gainesville, Florida for the Florida vs Florida State game. 

Players of the week:

Week Fourteen- ACC Championship Game

Rankings

All-ACC teams

First Team

Offense
QB Josh Nesbitt- Georgia Tech       
RB Jonathan Dwyer- Georgia Tech       
RB Ryan Williams- Virginia Tech       
WR Demaryius Thomas- Georgia Tech       
WR Donovan Varner- Duke       
TE George Bryan- NC State 
TE Michael Palmer – Clemson
OT Jason Curtis Fox- Miami       
OT Anthony Castonzo- Boston College       
OG Cordaro Howard- Georgia Tech       
OG Rodney Hudson- Florida State       
C  Sean Bedford- Georgia Tech       
PK Matt Bosher- Miami
PK Matt Waldron- Virginia Tech
SPEC C. J. Spiller- Clemson

Defense
DE Derrick Morgan- Georgia Tech       
DE Robert Quinn- North Carolina       
DT Nate Collins- Virginia       
DT Allen Bailey- Miami      
LB Cody Grimm- Virginia Tech        
LB Luke Kuechly- Boston College       
LB Quan Sturdivant- North Carolina  
LB Alex Wujciak- Maryland        
CB Kendric Burney- North Carolina        
CB Brandon Harris- Miami       
S DeAndre McDaniel- Clemson       
S Deunta Williams- North Carolina       
P Brent Bowden- Virginia Tech

Second Team

Offense
QB Thaddeus Lewis- Duke       
RB C. J. Spiller- Clemson       
RB Montel Harris- Boston College       
WR Torrey Smith- Maryland       
WR Jacoby Ford- Clemson      
TE Greg Boone- Virginia Tech
OT Ed Wang- Virginia Tech       
OT Chris Hairston- Clemson       
OG Thomas Austin- Clemson       
OG Sergio Render- Virginia Tech       
C  Matt Tennant- Boston College       
PK Casey Barth- North Carolina
PK Will Snyderwine- Duke
SPEC Torrey Smith- Maryland

Defense
DE Ricky Sapp- Clemson       
DE Willie Young- NC State       
DE Jason Worilds- Virginia Tech      
DT Marvin Austin- North Carolina
DT John Russell- Wake Forest      
LB Vincent Rey- Duke        
LB Darryl Sharpton- Miami       
LB Bruce Carter- North Carolina  
LB Colin McCarthy- Miami
LB Dekoda Watson- Florida State        
CB Ras-I Dowling- Virginia        
CB Patrick Robinson- Florida State       
S Morgan Burnett- Georgia Tech
S Kam Chancellor- Virginia Tech       
P Matt Bosher- Miami

Player of the year
C. J. Spiller- Clemson

Bowl games

Attendance

References